The 1963 IAAF World Race Walking Cup was held in Varese, Italy, on October 12–13, 1963.  The event was also known as Lugano Trophy.

Complete results were published.

Medallists

Results

Men's 20 km

Men's 50 km

Team
The team rankings, named Lugano Trophy, combined the 20km and 50km events team results.

Participation

 (6)
 (6)
 (6)
 (6)
 (6)
 (6)

Qualifying rounds 
From 1961 to 1985 there were qualifying rounds with the winners proceeding to the final.  Hungary progressed to final directly due to an epidemic in Hungary at time of qualifying round.

Zone 1
Essen, Federal Republic of Germany, September 22

Zone 2
Fredrikstad, Norway, August 24/25

Zone 3
Sofia, Bulgaria, September 1

Zone 4
Lausanne, Switzerland, September 7/8

Zone 5
Challes-les-Eaux, France, September 14/15

References

World Athletics Race Walking Team Championships
World Race Walking Cup
International athletics competitions hosted by Italy
World Race Walking Cup